The Colorado River Bridge at Bastrop is a -long bridge with three steel truss spans and concrete piers that crosses the Colorado River as part of Loop 150 through Bastrop, Texas. The three bridge spans over the river consist of identical Parker through trusses, each  in length, supported on concrete piers. The bridge is one of the earliest surviving uses of the Parker truss in Texas.

The Colorado River Bridge was the second bridge crossing at this location. The first bridge at the crossing was built from 1889 to 1890 at a cost of $45,000. This bridge replaced the ferries across the river, which had been in use since the 1830s. It was originally a toll bridge, but was later purchased by the county and the tolls were removed.

With automobiles becoming the dominant form of transportation in the United States after World War I, a new bridge was needed to handle the increasing traffic between Houston and Austin. The original estimate of the cost of the Colorado River Bridge was $40,000 and was partially financed by bonds issued by Bastrop County. The rest was paid for with federal funds disbursed by the Texas State Highway Department. Bids on the project were solicited and the Kansas City Bridge Co. was selected as contractor. The final cost of the bridge's construction was $167,500. The bridge was completed in 1923 and opened for use in January 1924. The original bridge was sold and torn down in the early 1930s.

Ownership of the Colorado River Bridge probably passed from the county to the state during the Great Depression, as the local governments did not have the funds to maintain their road systems.

Growth in Bastrop in the 1990s strained the capacity of the narrow two-lane bridge. A wider concrete beam bridge was built parallel to the Colorado River Bridge. The State of Texas transferred ownership of the truss bridge to the City of Bastrop and the bridge became a pedestrian walkway. The bridge is also used for special events such as the annual "Art on the Bridge" art show and sale. The bridge was listed in the National Register of Historic Places on July 19, 1990.

See also

National Register of Historic Places listings in Bastrop County, Texas
List of bridges on the National Register of Historic Places in Texas
List of crossings of the Colorado River

References

External links

Buildings and structures in Bastrop County, Texas
Bridges completed in 1890
Bridges completed in 1923
Road bridges on the National Register of Historic Places in Texas
National Register of Historic Places in Bastrop County, Texas
Transportation in Bastrop County, Texas
Former toll bridges in Texas
Bridges over the Colorado River (Texas)
Steel bridges in the United States
Parker truss bridges in the United States